Cryptochorina is a genus of moths in the family Geometridae.

Species
 Cryptochorina amphidasyaria (Oberthür, 1880)
 Cryptochorina polychroia (Wehrli 1941)

References

External links
 Cryptochorina at Markku Savela's Lepidoptera and Some Other Life Forms
 Natural History Museum Lepidoptera genus database

Gnophini